Vincent Edward Jones (15 June 1910 – 30 October 1971) was a member of the Queensland Legislative Assembly in Australia.

Biography
Jones was born in Barcaldine, Queensland, the son of Frank Harold Jones and his wife Kathleen Clarke (née Ivers). He was educated at Kalapa State School at Kalapa, Queensland and on leaving school became a dairy farmer, pig raiser and breeder.

On 16 June 1936 Jones married Doris Elsie McNamara and together had a son and a daughter. He died in October 1971 at his home in Yeppoon and was buried in the North Rockhampton Cemetery.

Public career
Jones started out in politics as an alderman on the Fitzroy Shire Council from 1944 to 1950.

At the 1950 Queensland state election, Jones won the new seat of Callide for the Country Party, easily defeating his Labor opponent, Patrick Moore. He went on to represent the electorate until his death in 1971. Jones was the Chief Government Whip from 1960–1971.

References

Members of the Queensland Legislative Assembly
1910 births
1971 deaths
National Party of Australia members of the Parliament of Queensland
20th-century Australian politicians